Martha Creek Provincial Park is a provincial park in British Columbia, Canada, located on the Lake Revelstoke Reservoir north of the city of Revelstoke.

References

Provincial parks of British Columbia
Columbia Country
Columbia River
1993 establishments in British Columbia
Protected areas established in 1993